The Indigenous Australian rugby league team (also known as the Indigenous All Stars or Indigenous Dreamtime team) is a rugby league football team that represents Aboriginal Australians and Torres Strait Islanders.  The team was first formed in 1973 and currently plays in an annual All Stars Match against a National Rugby League NRL All Stars team.

History
An Aboriginal v White Australian rugby league game was held in Barcaldine in Western Queensland in 1963. These 'Blacks v Whites' games continued annually until 1984.

The first Australian Aboriginal rugby league team was assembled in 1973 The Aboriginal team managed to win seven of its nine matches in just 10 days, The team consisted of 34 players – 19 from NSW, 13 from Queensland and two from the Northern Territory. They went on to win games against Kiwi premiers Wellington Petone, the only all-Maori team & Auckland club & Te Atatu, which the Aboriginal side won 17–13.

The side competed in the Pacific Cup in 1990, 1992 and 1994.  During this period the team contained New South Wales Rugby League first grade players such as Ricky Walford, Graham Lyons, Ron Gibbs, Darrell Trindall, Paul Davis, Wayne Alberts, George Longbottom and Will Robinson.

In the post-1999 NRL season an Aboriginal side managed by Arthur Beetson defeated the Papua New Guinea Kumuls and the future rugby league Immortal was pushing for an Australia Day match against the Australian national team.

In 2008 World Cup curtain raiser to the Australia vs. New Zealand match included an Indigenous Australian squad playing against New Zealand Māori which featured several prominent NRL players and rising stars, including Chris Sandow, Wairangi Koopu, Preston Campbell, Shaun Kenny-Dowall and Carl Webb.

Preston Campbell, a highly respected aboriginal rugby league player, was a driving force behind the setup, in 2010, of a curtain raising match between the Indigenous All Stars, and the NRL All Stars. The Indigenous All Stars played what seems likely become an annual match against the National Rugby League All Stars on 13 February 2010. The squad was chosen in part by public vote. Aboriginal NRL player Sid Domic's artistic ability led him to be selected from a field of six artists to design the Indigenous side's jersey, as well as Johnathan Thurston's and Jamie Soward's custom headgear, for the annual All Stars matches.

2019 will see a new format of the Australian Indigenous All-Stars play the New Zealand Māori at AAMI Park in Melbourne on 15 February. It will be part of an All-Stars double header with the women's teams to play the curtain-raiser Māori and indigenous teams to the men's game. With no All-Stars game in 2017 due to the World Cup, the NRL will be hoping the inclusion of the New Zealand Māori side will spark popularity in the fixture. With three Indigenous players also eligible for both teams Dane Gagai, Reimis Smith, Josh Hoffman and Javid Bowen.

Teams

First Australian Aboriginal Rugby League Team 1973 Tour
 Michael Anderson
 Neil Appo
 John Brady
 Marshall Brown
 Don Carter
 Phillip de la Cruz
 Les Drew
 Archie Glass
 Jeffrey Hennaway
 Larry Hoskins
 Desi Illis
 Allen Madden
 Patrick Marra
 Ron Mason
 Ambrose Morgan
 Thomas Moylan
 Michael Mundine
 Steve Ridgeway
 Clarke Scott
 Bruce Stewart
 Wally Tallis
 Francis Tappin
 Geoffrey Thorne
 Neville Thorne
 Albert Torrens
 Eddie Vale
 Terry Wickey
 Bill Widders
 Victor Wright

1990-92-1994 Australian Aborigines Pacific Cup Team
 Wayne Alberts 
 Paul Davis 
 Ron Gibbs 
 George Longbottom 
 Graham Lyons
 Will Robinson 
 Darrell Trindall
 Ricky Walford 
 Jason Wilson (Walgett Rugby League)

1999 Australian Aborigines
 Cliff Lyons (c) 
 John Buttigieg 
 Owen Craigie 
 John Doyle 
 Justin Doyle 
 Alf Duncan 
 Peter Ellis 
 Damien Higgins
 Lee Hookey 
 Damian Kennedy 
 Kevin McGuinness 
 Dennis Moran 
 John Simon 
 Robbie Simpson 
 Blaine Stanley 
 Mark Tookey 
 Albert Torrens 
 Carl Webb
 Dean Widders
 Coach - Arthur Beetson

2008 Indigenous Team of the Century (1908–2007)

2008 Indigenous Dreamtime

2010 Indigenous All Stars

2011 Indigenous All Stars

2012 Indigenous All Stars

2013 Indigenous All Stars

2014 Festival of Indigenous Rugby League
The NRL launched a Festival of Indigenous Rugby League program to take the place of the prestigious pre-season Rugby League All Stars game following every World Cup year. The 2014 Festival of Indigenous Rugby League featured a trial match between the Knights and a non-elite Indigenous team, drawn from the immensely popular NSW Koori Rugby League Knockout and Murri Carnivals in Queensland, as well as the NRL Indigenous Player Cultural Camp, Murri vs Koori women's and Under 16s representative games, a Murri v Koori match, a jobs expo and community visits.

2015 Indigenous All Stars

2016 Indigenous All Stars

2017 Indigenous All Stars

2019 Indigenous All Stars

Indigenous Team of the Decade (2010–2019)

2020 Indigenous All Stars

2021 Indigenous All Stars

2022 Indigenous All Stars

Results

2022 Player Pool
National Rugby League (Australia) 
Selwyn Cobbo (Brisbane Broncos)
Ryan James (Brisbane Broncos)
Albert Kelly (Brisbane Broncos)
Brenko Lee (Brisbane Broncos)
Ezra Mam (Brisbane Broncos)
Tyrone Roberts (Brisbane Broncos)
Zac Saddler (Brisbane Broncos)
Kotoni Staggs (Brisbane Broncos)

Adam Elliott (Canberra Raiders)
Jamal Fogarty (Canberra Raiders)
Sebastian Kris (Canberra Raiders)
Xavier Savage (Canberra Raiders)
Jack Wighton (Canberra Raiders)

Josh Addo-Carr (Canterbury-Bankstown Bulldogs)
Bailey Biondi-Odo (Canterbury-Bankstown Bulldogs)
Braidon Burns (Canterbury-Bankstown Bulldogs)
Josh Cook (Canterbury-Bankstown Bulldogs)
Brent Naden (Canterbury-Bankstown Bulldogs)

Andrew Fifita (Cronulla-Sutherland Sharks)
Wade Graham (Cronulla-Sutherland Sharks)
William Kennedy (Cronulla-Sutherland Sharks)
Nicho Hynes (Cronulla-Sutherland Sharks)
Jesse Ramien (Cronulla-Sutherland Sharks)
Braydon Trindall (Cronulla-Sutherland Sharks)

Jayden Campbell (Gold Coast Titans)
David Fifita (Gold Coast Titans)
Brian Kelly (Gold Coast Titans)
Jonus Pearson (Gold Coast Titans)
Will Smith (Gold Coast Titans)
Treymain Spry (Gold Coast Titans)
Corey Thompson (Gold Coast Titans)

Jason Saab (Manly-Warringah Sea Eagles)

Reimis Smith (Melbourne Storm)

Dane Gagai (Newcastle Knights)
Edrick Lee (Newcastle Knights)

Joshua Curran (New Zealand Warriors)
Ashley Taylor (New Zealand Warriors)
Reece Walsh (New Zealand Warriors)

Reuben Cotter (North Queensland Cowboys)
Scott Drinkwater (North Queensland Cowboys)
Hamiso Tabuai-Fidow (North Queensland Cowboys)
Jamayne Taunoa-Brown (North Queensland Cowboys)

J'maine Hopgood (Penrith Panthers) 
Chris Smith (Penrith Panthers)

Troy Dargan (South Sydney Rabbitohs)
Alex Johnston (South Sydney Rabbitohs)
Blake Taaffe (South Sydney Rabbitohs)
Cody Walker (South Sydney Rabbitohs) 

Jack Bird (St. George Illawarra Dragons)
Tyrell Fuimaono (St. George Illawarra Dragons)
Josh Kerr (St. George Illawarra Dragons)
Tyrell Sloan (St. George Illawarra Dragons)
Jayden Sullivan (St. George Illawarra Dragons)

Connor Watson (Sydney roosters)

Daine Laurie (Wests Tigers)
Tyrone Peachey (Wests Tigers)
James Roberts (Wests Tigers)

Super League Europe
Josh Drinkwater (Catalans Dragons)

Aidan Sezer (Huddersfield Giants)

Robert Lui (Leeds Rhinos)

Nathan Peats (Leigh Centurions)

Joel Thompson (St Helens R.F.C.)

David Fifita (Wakefield Trinity)

Greg Inglis (Warrington Wolves)

Jai Field (Wigan Warriors)
Bevan French (Wigan Warriors)

See also

 Australian national rugby league team
 List of Indigenous All Stars players

References

External links
 rleague.com

 
Rugby league representative teams in Australia
Australia national rugby league team